Sheth P.T. Arts & Science College, established in 1960, is a general degree college in Godhra, Gujarat. It  is affiliated to Shri Govind Guru University and offers undergraduate courses in science and arts.

Departments

Science

Chemistry
Physics 
Mathematics
Botany
Microbiology

Arts 

English
Gujarati
Economics
Sanskrit
Hindi
Home Science
Psychology

Accreditation
Sheth P.T. Arts & Science College was accredited by the National Assessment and Accreditation Council (NAAC).

References

External links
http://www.sptgodhra.org

Colleges affiliated to Gujarat University
Universities and colleges in Gujarat
Gujarat University
Educational institutions established in 1960
1960 establishments in Gujarat